Selja is a village in Hiiumaa Parish, Hiiu County in northwestern Estonia.

The first Estonian professional composer Rudolf Tobias (1873–1918) was born and spent his early childhood in Selja. His father Johannes Tobias worked there as the parish clerk. Since 1973, a memorial museum operates in Tobias' birth house.

References

Villages in Hiiu County